Sam Schröder (born 25 September 1999) is a Dutch wheelchair tennis player. 

Schröder has a career high Quad Wheelchair singles ranking of 1, achieved on 14 February 2022. He also has a career high Quad Wheelchair doubles ranking of 1, achieved on 31 December 2021. Schröder won his first major title at the 2020 US Open, defeating Dylan Alcott in the final of the Quad Singles event.

Personal life
Schröder has split hand/split foot syndrome (SHFM), a rare genetic disorder which has caused his hands and feet to develop abnormally.

Career statistics

Performance timelines

Current through 2023 Australian Open.

Quad singles

Grand Slam tournament finals

Quad singles: 9 (4 titles, 5 runner-ups)

Quad doubles: 9 (5 titles, 4 runner-ups)

References

External links
 
 
  

1999 births
Living people
Dutch male tennis players
Wheelchair tennis players
Paralympic wheelchair tennis players of the Netherlands
Paralympic gold medalists for the Netherlands
Paralympic silver medalists for the Netherlands
Paralympic medalists in wheelchair tennis
Medalists at the 2020 Summer Paralympics
Wheelchair tennis players at the 2020 Summer Paralympics
People from Geleen
ITF number 1 ranked wheelchair tennis players
Sportspeople from Limburg (Netherlands)
21st-century Dutch people